A Voice Within is the first studio album by the Canadian progressive metal band Intervals, released on March 4, 2014. It is their first release with vocals and the only one with the singer Mike Semesky.

Track listing

Personnel
Mike Semesky - vocals
Aaron Marshall - guitar, bass guitar
Lukas Guyader -  guitar, backing vocals on "Ephemeral", "Moment Marauder" and "Automaton"
Anup Sastry - drums
Cameron McLellan - additional bass guitar
Produced by Intervals, Cameron McLellan and Jordan Valeriote
Engineered and mixed by Jordan Valeriote
Mastered by Troy Glessner
Additional engineering by Cameron McLellan, Anup Sastry, Ken Dudley, and Scott Beseris
Nils Mikkelsen - electric piano on "Moment Marauder"
Lukas Guyader - string arrangement on "The Self Surrendered"
Randy Slaugh - string producer on "The Self Surrendered"
Ariel Loveland - violin on "The Self Surrendered"
Emily Rust - violin on "The Self Surrendered"
Michael Rollins - viola on "The Self Surrendered"
Sara Cerrato - cello on "The Self Surrendered"
Choir vocals on "The Self Surrendered" by Michael Ciccia, Matt HK, Lukas Guyader, Anup Sastry and Aaron Marshall
Backing vocals on "Atlas Hour" by Anup Sastry, Lukas Guyader and Aaron Marshall

References

2014 albums
Intervals (band) albums